"Separated" is a song by American R&B singer Avant. It was written by Avant and Steve "Stone" Huff for his debut album My Thoughts (2000), while production was helmed by Huff. MCA Records and Magic Johnson Music released the song as the album's lead single in April 2000. "Separated" spent one week atop the US Hot R&B/Hip-Hop Songs, also peaking at number 23 on the US Billboard Hot 100. A remix version of the song, co-written by Sparkle, features singer Kelly Rowland, formerly of Destiny's Child. A different remix features rapper Foxy Brown.

Track listings

Credits and personnel
Credits lifted from the album's liner notes.

 Myron Avant – writing
 Steve Huff – production, writing
 Sparkle – writing (Remix)

Charts

Weekly charts

Year-end charts

Awards and nominations

Soul Train Music Award
2000, Best R&B/Soul Single, Male (nominated)

References

2000 debut singles
2000 songs
Avant songs
MCA Records singles